Carol Diane Ryff is an American academic and psychologist. She received her doctorate in 1978. She is known for studying psychological well-being and psychological resilience. She is the Hilldale Professor of psychology at the University of Wisconsin-Madison, where she directs the Institute on Aging.

References

External links
Ryff's faculty page

University of Wisconsin–Madison faculty
Living people
American women psychologists
21st-century American psychologists
Pennsylvania State University alumni
Year of birth missing (living people)
American women academics
21st-century American women